LNER Peppercorn Class A1 No. 60163 Tornado is a 4-6-2 steam locomotive completed in 2008 to an original design by Arthur Peppercorn. It is the first new build British mainline steam locomotive since 1960, and the only Peppercorn Class A1 in existence after the original batch were scrapped. In 2017, Tornado became the first steam locomotive to officially reach  on British tracks in over 50 years.

After the project was founded by the A1 Steam Locomotive Trust in 1990, construction of Tornado began in 1994 and mostly took place at Darlington Works, with other components manufactured elsewhere. The project was financed through fundraising initiatives, public donations, sponsorship deals, and hiring out Tornado itself for special services. The locomotive was granted its mainline certificate in January 2009, having been designed in compliance with modern safety and certification standards. Tornado has worked on heritage and mainline trains across Britain since 2008. In 2022, it was withdrawn for overhaul.

Background

In 1990, the charitable A1 Steam Locomotive Trust was founded with the intention of building a new LNER Peppercorn Class A1 steam locomotive and the 50th member of its class. The original 49 Peppercorn A1s were built in 1948 and 1949 at Doncaster and Darlington Works at £16,000 each. They were initially ordered for operation on the London and North Eastern Railway (LNER) to a design by its chief mechanical engineer Arthur Peppercorn, but were delivered after the company had been nationalised and became British Railways. The Peppercorn A1s ran services on the East Coast Main Line until the last one was scrapped in September 1966 after a comparatively short service of 15 years. None of them was preserved.

Tornado was intended to be built as the next Peppercorn A1 and not a restoration nor replica, and was assigned the next available number in the class after No. 60162 Saint Johnstoun. It was designed as an evolved member of its class, incorporating various improvements that would have occurred had steam continued in Britain. It was the first new build steam locomotive on British railways since BR Standard Class 9F 92220 Evening Star was completed in 1960.

 
The name Tornado was chosen in honour of the Royal Air Force Panavia Tornado air crews flying at the time in the Gulf War. The honour of choosing the name was given to a £50,000 sponsor of the project. In January 1995, officers of the Royal Air Force presented the Tornado nameplates to the trust at Tyseley Locomotive Works at a frame laying ceremony. The smokebox door carries the identification plate of 51 A, the code for Darlington shed, and the cab side carries a builder's plate No. 2195 Darlington 2008. The front buffer beam carries the designation A1.

On 19 February 2009, Tornado was officially named by the Prince of Wales, accompanied by the Duchess of Cornwall and Dorothy Mather, Peppercorn's widow, at York railway station. The ceremony is marked by a plaque located below the nameplate. Tornado then pulled the Royal Train to Leeds.

Project milestones 

 
 
 
  at the frame laying ceremony, January
 
 
 
 
 
 
  (Autumn)

Design

Initial research and draughting

On hearing of the project in October 1991, Argentine locomotive engineer Livio Dante Porta contacted the trust, hailing the project as the start of a "renaissance of steam technology". In 1992, he submitted A proposal for the Tornado project in which he presented to the trust several design improvements that could be made to Tornado that, while preserving the outer form, would make it a second-generation steam locomotive. Since the trust was not creating a replica of a Peppercorn A1 but the next in its class, Porta's suggestions were duly considered and the trust reported only some of his ideas could be adopted as his others were untried and presented too many risks, which Porta estimated would have taken 20,000 test miles to iron out his improvements. Ironically, in 2003, it was decided to make Tornado oil-fired for cost and operational reasons, following earlier dual-fuelled coal-and-oil-fired proposals in 1998, when boiler design commenced. This was later abandoned in favour of the original design of coal firing, due to the large increase in global fossil fuel prices, and to save the certification costs of this design difference.

There were no general arrangement drawings of a Peppercorn A1, so rough engineering dimensions for Tornado were obtained from measuring Peppercorn Class A2 60532 Blue Peter at the National Railway Museum (NRM). Many of the drawings originally used at Doncaster Works for the Peppercorn A1's had been preserved at the NRM, and a team of volunteers spent three days collating these in 1991. The original drawings were India ink drawings on linen which had to be scanned into a computer aided design (CAD) software program as the microfilm copies at the NRM were not suitable for manufacturing purposes, and direct dyeline copies could not be made. 95% of the original drawings were found, with 1,100 scanned by 1993, and a further 140 in 2001. A few poor quality originals required re-drawing. Updated specifications were required to be drawn up to account for out-of-date material specifications and drawing notes whose original meaning could not be determined. Other design details were also obtained through interviews with Peppercorn's former assistant, J.F. Harrison.

Changes from the original Peppercorn A1s 

Tornado design was modified where necessary to better suit modern manufacturing techniques and to fit in with the modern high-speed railway, while retaining the greater part of the original design. As an evolution of the Peppercorn Class A1, Tornado would also incorporate improvements that would have been made to the class had steam continued, such as correction of the rough riding faults.

The following design changes were made for cost or operational reasons:
 An all-welded boiler (i.e. not riveted)
 Steel firebox (not copper)
 One-piece frames
 Roller bearings
 Improved front bogie
 Improved steam circuit
 Altered tender coal/water balance (more water)
 Overall weight reduction

Additionally, to meet current safety and operation standards, Tornado includes:
 Up-rated electrical supplies
 Primary air (not steam) brakes
 LED cluster head/tail lamps
 Vacuum brakes (for heritage railway stock)
 1 inch (25 mm) reduction in overall height (for overhead line equipment (OLE) regulations)
 Automatic Warning System (AWS)
 Train Protection & Warning System (TPWS)
 Data recorder
 European Rail Traffic Management System (ERTMS) compatible GSM-Railway (GSM-R) cab radio

These are probably the most accurate steam locomotive frames ever produced. Despite their higher costs, roller bearings were used owing to the reliability they had demonstrated after a trial on some of the original engines. This caused an unforeseen problem in 2003 since the modifications made to the tender in the original fitting of roller bearings as an experiment to some Peppercorn A1s had not been properly drawn for the Cartazzi axle of the trailing wheels.

A  reduction in height from the original  height was required by the Network Rail regulations, and was achieved by a redesign of the dome and safety valve mountings on the boiler, and by reprofiling of the cab roof and chimney. Testing was planned to occur with a lipped chimney, and on receipt of the first full livery, Tornado would be fitted with an authentic rimless chimney, described as the original non-capped version. The fluted chimney was still not fitted at the time of its LNER Apple Green livery launch on 13 December 2008, due to it still being machined at the manufacturer. It was completed and fitted in time for the inaugural main line passenger run. The chimney was also fitted with a spark arrestor. Tornado has two whistles: a standard LNER "teapot" whistle on the cab front and an ex-LNER chime whistle from LNER Class A4 4482 Golden Eagle behind the right-hand deflector.

Boiler from Meiningen Works 

Consideration of the boiler began in late 1998. No standard gauge boiler had been built in Britain for such a large express locomotive since the 1960s, and it was required to be based on the original LNER design but meet modern safety standards. Design changes included the cheaper modern-day fabrication method of a welded, rather than riveted, firebox and boiler tubing; the use of steel, rather than copper, for the firebox; and the aforementioned height reduction for Network Rail regulations. While manufacturing facilities still existed in Britain to manufacture such a large boiler, because of the design differences from the originals the trust required a supplier with specific experience of designing, building, and certification of modern steam engine boilers as required by the EU's Pressure Equipment Directive.

In early 2002, the Deutsche Bahn's Meiningen Steam Locomotive Works in Germany was identified as a suitable supplier. It possessed the required knowledge as main line steam operation had continued in East Germany until the mid-1980s, 70% of its work still involved steam, and it still possessed the powerful plate roller machines. The trust did not have sufficient funding to place the order until January 2005. On 16 July 2006, the boiler arrived by sea and was unloaded at Darlington with a 200-ton crane, having taken just nine months to build. The fitting of the 21-ton firebox and boiler unit to the wheeled locomotive frame was said to have been a perfect fit, requiring no grinding at all, a tribute to the accuracy of the design and construction at Meiningen. The fitting was not without incident though, as the extra weight caused some compaction of the trackbed, and assistance was required to move the locomotive back into the works, by a combination of being winched, towed by a forklift truck and pushed with Land Rovers.

A further modification to the boiler design has been the use of hollow stays which support and separate the outer boiler and inner firebox. The hollow stays act as an indicator of any cracks in the otherwise inaccessible stays, such cracks being revealed by water leaks. Leaks have in fact been detected and have led to the locomotive being unavailable for service. Replacement stays were fitted in 2010.

Tender and wheelset 

In 1991, a preference for a "Doncaster pattern" riveted tender was expressed as per the original Peppercorn A1s. The redundant tender of LNER Class A3 4472 Flying Scotsman was acquired, although later returned unused, allowing Tornado to remain a completely originally-manufactured locomotive. By 2002, it was agreed that a flush sided (all welded) boiler and tender was appropriate for a Darlington-built Peppercorn A1, making construction and maintenance easier. The tender was redesigned internally, removing the water scoop, increasing the water capacity from 5,000 to 6,000 gallons, and reducing coal capacity from 9 to 7.5 tons. In 2003 the need for a second tender for Tornado was discounted.

The motion components alone cost £150,000, taking £50,000 to forge (and requiring three years to complete) and £100,000 to machine. The wheelset was the first mainline steam locomotive wheelset to be manufactured in Britain since 1960, and took five years and nine suppliers. The wheels were so smooth that the complete locomotive could easily be pushed out of the works by human power alone, as seen when the locomotive was moved outside in preparation for its first steam-powered moves. If the locomotive were to be suspended, the entire wheel and motion arrangement could be turned by hand.

Manufacture 

Tornado was mostly assembled at the A1 Trust's Darlington Locomotive Works, bringing together components manufactured around the country and some from overseas. Actual manufacture and construction started in 1994 before the works opened, with casting of the cylinders and wheels, the cutting of the frames, and construction of the cab. The locomotive frames were assembled at Tyseley Locomotive Works in Birmingham, which was marked by a laying ceremony on 5 January 1995 and completed by October 1996.

In March 1997 Tornado, as a completed frame and inside cylinder, was displayed in the Great Hall at the National Railway Museum for several weeks. She returned to Tyseley to await completion of Darlington Works. The elements of Tornado were brought together with the opening of the works in 1997, and the opening ceremony saw the unveiled locomotive, now consisting of the frame with its three cylinders and cab attached. Early 1998 saw the smokebox construction started and the tyres fitted and by 1999, forging of the motion components had started with the first delivery of components commencing in January 2000.

By September 1999, the last wheel had been pressed onto the wheelset, which was delivered to Darlington by July 2000. By January 2000, the front bogie had been assembled. With the fitting of these parts, the mounting of the frame onto the wheelset, and fitting of the smokebox, by the end of 2000, the most visible missing parts of Tornado were the boiler and tender.

Post-2000, assembly and setting of the motion proceeded, and attention turned to the design of the boiler; a £250,000 appeal was launched. Tornado became a rolling chassis by October 2002, and achieved the first synchronous movement of the motion and all wheels in August 2004. 2005 saw construction of the boiler in Germany, with construction begun on 16 October, and completed in time for delivery on 16 July 2006. By June 2007 Tornado's internal construction was sufficiently complete to allow fitting of the boiler to the frame, using a 100-ton crane. The most complex casting, the superheater header, was started in 2007, and after defeating two foundries the complex shape was cast by a third supplier. Owing to space constraints at Darlington works, the Tornado tender frames and body were built off-site, with the body being significantly built locally in Darlington. The tender wheelsets were assembled by an East Lancs Railway-based company. The tender frame and wheelset were united by December 2007, and the tank attached to it by February 2008.

From its construction until final testing was completed, Tornado sported a grey coloured undercoat as a precaution in case the boiler cladding had to be removed. The livery was described as "works grey" in a "satin finish". While in this undercoat, Tornado wore the web address of the A1 Trust on the side of the tender and the mark RA9 on the locomotive cab, denoting its route availability.

Commissioning

Boiler tests 
[[File:Boiler safety valve of 60163 Tornado.jpg|thumb|left|One of Tornado'''s boiler safety valves]]
A computer simulation was used to assist in the setting up of the valves and motion. The boiler safety valves were tested on LNER Class A4 60009 Union of South Africa at the Severn Valley Railway before their delivery to Meiningen for fitting to Tornado. The boiler was hydraulically tested at the manufacturer's factory at one-and-a-half times working pressure and was passed safe. On 11 January 2008, the boiler passed its first steam test in a series of tests carried out by an external boiler inspector. The boiler was noted by the inspector to be a very rapid one, boding well for use on the mainline, and noted Tornado exhibited no leaks of any kind, in contrast to heritage locomotive restorations.

The tender body was not yet finished by this time so the test was conducted using a water bowser. The boiler created steam so efficiently that the water supply was being used faster than it could be replenished by the mains water supply to the works. To complete the test and not prematurely damp down the fire, an emergency call for water was made to the local fire brigade, who responded with a fire tender to supply more water. This was sensationally but inaccurately reported in one local newspaper as "fire brigade called to prevent boiler explosion".

 Launch and Great Central Railway trials 

After a series of private tests, Tornado made her first in-steam moves on 29 July 2008, followed by its official launch on 1 August, moving up and down the test siding in front of the press. The 1 August launch coincided with the 40th anniversary of the end of steam on British Railways on 4 August 1968, and the 60th anniversary of the entry into traffic of the first Peppercorn A1 class locomotive, No. 60114 W.P. Allen. On 7 August, Tornado was entered onto Total Operations Processing System (TOPS), a computer system used in the UK for managing locomotives and rolling stock. Although the painted number is 60163, Tornado is designated 98863 on the British main line in TOPS, where "98" describes a steam engine, the "8" stems from the power classification of 8P, and "63" comes from its 60163 number.

From Darlington Works, Tornado was moved by road on two articulated lorries to the Great Central Railway on 19 August, where she performed mileage accumulation and testing before hauling her first passenger trains. Testing of the On-Train Monitoring Recorder (OTMR), Train Protection & Warning System (TPWS), Automatic Warning System (AWS), and air brakes was also done at the GCR, and are standard for all steam locomotives requiring certification for main line running, with speed and regulator positions tracked by the onboard recording equipment stored under the driver's seat. After three days, Tornado had completed her first non-stop mile run and had hauled empty coaches. One load test involved a rake of 11 coaches and a Class 45 diesel locomotive, and another saw her achieve 2,000 drawbar horsepower. On 10 September Tornado was officially timed for the first time, hauling 518 tons up the 1-in-176 gradient south from Rothley station. For the GCR's Day out with Thomas event during the Summer Bank Holiday weekend, Tornado wore a small Thomas face for light runs.Tornado first passenger trains took place on 21 September 2008; the first was the 10.15 a.m. non-stop service from Quorn and Woodhouse to Leicester North.Heritage Railway magazine, Issue 116, 2–29 October 2008 On this day, 1,000–2,000 covenantors, donors and guests travelled on the services. The first service for fare-paying passengers began on 22 September, where over 1,000 people were carried on the three sold-out trips. On 4 October, Tornado took part in the 125th anniversary of the Boys' Brigade, wearing a special headboard and hauled the GCR's preserved Travelling Post Office train. Her final passenger run on the GCR was on 12 October, and had run  by the end of the month. The president of the GCR said Tornado achieved a "smooth debut", and the engine was described as having performed "effortlessly" and "faultlessly".

 Mainline test runs 
On 21 October 2008, Tornado arrived at the National Railway Museum in York, and was first put on display in the Great Hall for several days, where she was placed on its central turntable for the annual railway industry dinner on 23 October.

The acceptance testing based at York was conducted by DB Schenker. Three test runs were planned for 4, 6 and 18 November 2008, involving out and back journeys from York in the evenings. The third run was a  trip to Newcastle with a rake of empty coaches that reached  On this run, the web address on the side of the tender was replaced with the National Express logo. All runs were carried out successfully.

Following the test runs, Tornado received her first full livery at the NRM's paint shop where she was painted in LNER Apple Green with "British Railways" on the tender, as worn by the first original 30 Peppercorn A1s. The livery was applied traditionally, brush painted by hand. She was unveiled on the turntable at the NRM's Great Hall on 13 December 2008 at a launch ceremony attended by 500 supporters of the A1 Trust. A dynamometer car from the North Eastern Railway was attached. Due to time constraints, detailing was completed on one side only at the time of the launch, after which Tornado returned to the paint shop before going back on display for the Christmas period. On 11 January 2009, Tornado left the NRM for preparations for her mainline passenger debut. A final test run was completed with a single support coach from York to Leeds and back, on 28 January.

 Certification 
As a new build locomotive, Tornado certification was more complex in comparison to a restored one and required liaison with Network Rail, HMRI, and a vehicle acceptance body, with the origin of all construction materials needing to be documented and every aspect of the manufacture recorded. Following manufacture, a technical file and Notified Body certificate was obtained on completion of a manufacturing and maintenance procedures review which was managed by DeltaRail Group Ltd. Tornado was also required to pass the 2006 European Interoperability of the conventional rail system directive, achieved through compliance with the National Notified Technical Rules (formerly the Railway Group Standards), though it was exempt from portions of the regulations, as are many mainline steam locomotives, such as from the need for a yellow warning panel or crumple zones. In liaison with Network Rail, a route acceptance strategy was agreed upon and approval for Tornado to enter service was granted by the Office of Rail Regulation (ORR). This was completed in two stages, approval under the Railway and Other Transport Systems regulations, for use on the GCR and other preserved lines, and then as an "interoperable" locomotive for use on the mainline network.

As well as standard tests, as technically a new design of locomotive, Tornado was required to undergo specific extra tests set by the by the Network Rail Safety Review Panel to examine ride quality and track force, in order to assess the effect the locomotive would have on the main line track. Measurements were taken on board by 21 sensors measuring pitch and roll, and acceleration and deceleration. Measurements were also taken through the use of track-side sensors measuring side forces exerted on the rails, augmented with freeze-frame footage of the position of the wheels as they passed. The results were compared with control readings taken at the same site using BR Standard Class 7 70013 Oliver Cromwell two weeks later. The preliminary results were described as producing "no untoward signals".Tornado was granted an Engineering Acceptance (EA) certificate on 31 October by DeltaRail and a Route Acceptance certificate on 3 November by Network Rail, allowing testing on the main line to begin. Further tests were performed at Network Rail facilities located between York and Darlington, at a testing facility known as a WheelChex. This consists of track fitted with sensors to measure vertical force effects such as hammer blow. Completion of a test run between York and Leeds on 28 January 2009 signalled the gaining of certification to haul passengers on the Network Rail main line.

It was stated that while a 10% overspeed is allowed (and may be required) in such new equipment test runs (A4 Class 4464 Bittern reached  in 2007), Tornado had not been planned or authorised to do so on this test. It was suggested that the discrepancy might have been down to the equipment on the Class 67 having had its gearing altered but not having been recalibrated.

 Operation 
 First mainline runs 

To assist in passenger operation, in 2008 the Trust purchased a Mark 1 composite corridor support coach which entered traffic in 2013. Tornado has a route availability of 9. From 2009, Tornado began to recoup the estimated £800,000 debt from the project.

On 31 January 2009, Tornado completed her first passenger trip on the British mainline, hauling The Peppercorn Pioneer in a return trip from York to Newcastle via Darlington and Durham. The route was a replica of the last tour hauled by the last surviving original Peppercorn A1, 60145 St Mungo, 42 years earlier. The same journey was planned for 1 February, but on advice from the British Transport Police and Network Rail, the second trip ran from Doncaster to Durham with Tornado hauling only part of the return leg. Both trips carried 500 passengers, and were organised for covenanters only. This was followed by her first mainline train available to the wider public on 7 February, hauling the A1 Trust's own The Talisman from Darlington to London King's Cross. Her first departures out of London were to be two circular tours named the Cathedrals Express from Victoria station on 14 February, but the first tour was subsequently changed and left from Waterloo.

In April 2009, Tornado appeared at the LNER-themed event at Barrow Hill Roundhouse where she featured alongside Peppercorn A2 Class 60532 Blue Peter and Class A4s 4498 Sir Nigel Gresley and 4488 Union of South Africa.Steam Railway magazine, Issue 358, 9 January – 5 February 2009, page 35 Blue Peter was repainted in LNER Apple Green livery for display alongside Tornado, and their meeting re-created a scene not witnessed for nearly 50 years. Tornado also posed alongside narrow gauge locomotive No.7 Typhoon of the Romney, Hythe and Dymchurch Railway, recreating an LNER publicity shot held previously with Typhoon and LNER Class A3 4472 Flying Scotsman.

On 21 December, Tornado rescued about 100 people who were stranded by bad weather at London Victoria. A number of electric trains, which pick up their power from the third rail, were unable to run because of snow and ice on the line. Tornado was to haul a Cathedrals Express lunchtime special, but some booked passengers were unable to get there due to the conditions, leaving spare seats. The train's operators decided to offer them to commuters whose trains had been cancelled. Tornado also had an evening Cathedrals Express dining train, and the same offer was again made.

Four liveries

The A1 Trust promised to paint Tornado in all four liveries that the original Peppercorn A1s had worn during its first period of operation with its first 10-year boiler certificate. In early 2011, following remedial attention to its boiler in Germany, Tornado unveiled in BR Brunswick Green, which the original class wore in the 1950s. The "British Railways" on the tender was replaced with an emblem and crest. This lasted until its withdrawal for winter maintenance in late 2012, during which it was repainted in BR Express Passenger Blue, the second livery carried by the original class. In 2015, following an intermediate overhaul, Tornado returned to service in its original LNER Apple Green. This lasted until mid-2020 when it was painted in BR Brunswick Green in celebration of the A1 Trust's 30th anniversary, which lasted until its withdrawal for overhaul in 2022, where it was painted back into Apple Green.

 100 mph run 

The original Peppercorn A1s were easily capable of reaching  and in 2004, approval was sought for Tornado to achieve regular  operation. While older preserved steam locomotives are subject to speed restrictions due to age, approval for  running was possible for Tornado due to her new condition.

In the early hours of 12 April 2017, Tornado achieved  during a test run the East Coast Main Line, becoming the first steam locomotive to reach the speed on the British mainline since 1968.

Since 2009Tornado has hauled trains on the British mainline and heritage railways since 2009, helping to recoup the cost of the project. The A1 Trust has offered driver experiences at the controls of Tornado during visits to heritage lines.

In September 2011, Tornado set a new record for the longest single day trip in Britain by a steam locomotive since the 1960s, pulling The Caledonian Tornado from Crewe to Glasgow and back for over 530 miles. In 2013, she hauled the first steam-hauled service from London Victoria to Sheffield Park via East Grinstead and the Bluebell Railway since 1963. In 2017, Tornado was used by Northern Rail on scheduled public timetabled services between Appleby and Skipton prior to the reopening of the Settle–Carlisle line, which had been closed for a year because of a landslip. On 14 April 2018, while running at 90 mph south of Peterborough on The Ebor Flyer from London King's Cross to York, the locomotive's inside motion failed.https://www.a1steam.com/2018/04/17/tornado-repair-update/ Repairs update The subsequent repairs and re-testing took several months to complete.

In November 2021, Tornado was withdrawn from mainline service after a number of tender wheel flats caused by slippage from falling leaves were detected. Following an appearance at the Great Central Railway in January 2022, the locomotive moved to Loughborough for dismantling and major overhaul. It was to be complete in July, but delays caused by the COVID-19 pandemic while the boiler was being restored at Meiningen Works in Germany, and additional work needed on the driving wheels and tyres, led to its completion date pushed back to the spring of 2023. The overhaul will include the installation of European Rail Traffic Management System (ETCS) equipment which will make Tornado the first steam locomotive fitted with an in-cab signalling system.

 Funding Tornado carries a plaque bearing the following message:

 Fundraising Tornado was built by the Locomotive Construction Co Ltd, a wholly-owned subsidiary of the A1 Steam Locomotive Trust. At 1990s prices, the projected cost of the project was £1.6 million.

The trust has used Deeds of Covenant since the start of the project in 1990, marketed under the slogan "Build a main line loco for the price of a pint of beer a week!" Covenantors can wear a special A1 Trust tie and pay a fixed amount monthly by standing order, and for this they receive honour roll recognition, event and viewing priority, regular trust publications and the right to attend the annual conventions.

In September 1996, the concept of dedicated covenants was launched. Now renamed dedicated donations, these were one-off payments of £25 to £25,000 to sponsor a particular part. As with regular covenantors, dedicated donors receive recognition, and an engineering drawing of the component they sponsored.

In October 1999 a £250,000 appeal was launched to fund the boiler, whose absence was noticeable with Tornado then comprising a wheeled frame with completed cab and smokebox. As Tornado began to look like a locomotive with the mating of the frame with the wheelset in the autumn of 2000, fundraising progress increased, breaking previous records by recruiting 100 new covenantors in two months. By 2005, the trust had raised over £1.5m.

Completion of the boiler was achieved through a half-million pound bond issue. Following securing of the boiler funds, the last major part, the tender, was achieved with a £200,000 single sponsor donation.

By May 2008, £2.5m had been raised and spent, and the gap to the required £3m had been raised to complete Tornado. However, due to the Chinese economic boom causing raw materials cost increases, together with increased certification costs, a further £50,000 appeal had to be launched if main line running was to be achieved by September.

By the end of September 2008, the Trust still needed to raise £66,000 to pay for tests and trials to allow main line operation.60163 Tornado is on the go! BBC Tees – Industry, last updated 22 September 2008. Retrieved 24 October 2008 While at the GCR, the project costs were running at the rate of £10,000 a month, rising to "six-figure bills" for certification in the months up to January 2009.

Launched in 2004, the Trust's half-million pound bond issue offered 4% returns, but in January 2009 £100,000 worth of these bonds remained unsubscribed.

 Sponsorship 

In 1994 the A1 trust gained its first major sponsor, William Cook Cast Products. In 1997, Great North Eastern Railway (GNER), the then operator on the East Coast Main Line, became a sponsor, and decorated Darlington station for the event, as well as offering free travel for trust workers.
The trust gained Rolls-Royce as a sponsor in spring 1998. The trust's principal sponsor is William Cook Cast Products, which initially cast the driving wheels on "very advantageous terms", and later assisted with all the wheels and almost all other steel castings. As with GNER, Tornado's links to the East Coast Main Line brought with it support from the next incumbent operator, National Express East Coast, with sponsorship of the third main line test run to Newcastle. Significant savings were made through industrial sponsorship; by 1998 this was keeping costs at 40% of normal. Some components, such as the smokebox door, were even obtained free of charge.

 Other income 
Cost savings of a third of the original manufacturing costs were possible in some cases where the building of one locomotive allowed for cheaper construction methods, such as using one-off polystyrene casting patterns.

Several other events and fund-raising drives have assisted in funding the project, including a Land's End to John O'Groats bike ride. The Trust also received proceeds from the sale of limited edition models of Tornado in works grey livery.

A new book on the story of Tornado called Tornado 21st Century Steam, written by The Guardian's Jonathan Glancey, was released on 15 October 2010.

 Media 
A BBC film crew filmed the project at certain points on the journey, up to and including the arrival and operation of Tornado running at the GCR. The resulting film was used to make a 30-minute documentary film, Absolutely Chuffed: The Men Who Built a Steam Engine. It was first broadcast on BBC Four on 16 October 2008, as part of their Golden Age of Steam season. The film was released on Region 2 DVD on 28 December 2009 with unseen material and DVD extras.Tornado and the Tornado project was also partly featured in the BBC Four documentary episode The Last Days of Steam (series 8 of the Time Shift documentaries), and also on How Do They Do It? (channel Five version, season 3 episode 3). The project also featured on BBC 2's magazine programme Working Lunch broadcast on 3 December 2007.

 Top Gear Race to the North 

On 25 April 2009, Tornado hauled a 10-coach Cathedrals Express charter from London King's Cross to Edinburgh Waverley. This private train was filmed by the BBC for a retro Top Gear Race, in which Jeremy Clarkson on the train raced James May in a Jaguar XK120 and Richard Hammond on a Vincent Black Shadow motorbike. Tornado was booked to complete the  journey in 8 hours 2 minutes, without any passenger stops at stations, but with four water stops en route at Grantham, York, Tyne Yard and Berwick, totalling 95 minutes booked stoppage time. Because motorways did not exist in 1949 (the first not being built until 1959) May and Hammond were restricted to using A-roads. In a close finish, Tornado came second behind the Jaguar, with a difference of only about ten minutes between them. The train was formed from the maroon support coach and a uniform rake of nine Royal Scot blood and custard coaches. The race featured in the first episode of the show's 13th series, airing on 21 June 2009.

 In film 
60163 Tornado, as well as LMS Hughes Crab no. 13065, appeared in the 2017 film, Paddington 2.

 Models 

A "very limited edition" customised model from The Model Centre (TMC), based on the Bachmann OO scale model in grey livery helped raise funds for the project.Limited edition model of Tornado in her launch livery of works grey from TMC Official site news, 14 September 2008. Retrieved 27 October 2008 Another grey works Tornado was to be made by TMC but with National Express on her tender from her 18 November main line test run.

Bachmann released a Tornado model in BR Apple Green livery just before Christmas 2009. Unlike the TMC models, which featured a standard Bachmann A1 repainted in Tornado's then grey livery, and unlike the original Bachmann limited edition model of Tornado which had the locomotive in BR Brunswick Green livery with the late BR crest, the 2009 release was a new model, with most (though not all) of the detail differences applied. This is particularly evident on the tender, which features the enlarged water capacity and reduced coal storage of Tornado as compared to the original A1 locomotives. The model proved extremely popular, to the extent that 10 weeks after going on sale Bachmann stocks were exhausted and more models had to be ordered.

Since 2011, Hornby Railways have produced a model of Tornado in 00 gauge.

Graham Farish have produced a model in N scale.

For their 2013/2014 range, Bachmann released an Express Passenger Blue model of Tornado which is a standard repaint and slightly modified Peppercorn A1.

Darstaed Models are to manufacture an O scale model of Tornado using tinplate. The model will feature traditional three-rail electric pick up.

Accucraft (UK) make a live steam model of Tornado in gauge 1.

See also
 LMS-Patriot Project
 Pennsylvania Railroad 5550
 GWR 6800 Class 6880 Betton Grange
 Steam locomotives of the 21st century

Notes

 References 

 Further reading 
 
 
 
 
 The Tornado Story'', by Tony Streeter. The official Trust book, up to the Great Central Railway

External links 

Official site
 The A1 Steam Locomotive Trust

Images
 Modified image showing Tornado in BR Apple Green (Steam Railway Magazine)
 Pictures at Newcastle, 18 November 2008 (BBC Tyne)
 Tornado and support coach leaving York on her first mainline test to Scarborough BBC News
 Photo-Library of the A1 Steam Locomotive Trust, with pictures of 'historic A1s' and 'Building ''Tornado'''
 Photo-Library of the A1 Steam Locomotive Trust, with pictures of other types of locomotive, and other railway scenes
 A Flickr group for Tornado photos

Videos
 Tornado being offloaded at the NRM on arrival from the GCR The Northern Echo
 Interviews and tour outside the shed at the GCR on arrival, BBC News
 Interview with driver and static tour at Darlington Locomotive Works during first move weekend

Other
 Short editorial on Tornado and Britains love of steam Guardian, 2008

4-6-2 locomotives
Railway locomotives introduced in 2008
Standard gauge steam locomotives of Great Britain
Tornado
Steam locomotives of the 21st century
Articles containing video clips